Moe. Sells Out was a promotional tie-in with the jam band Moe's 1998 album Tin Cans & Car Tires. It was recorded live on July 17, 1998 at the Vic Theater in Chicago, Illinois. The album title is a take off from The Who's 1967 album The Who Sell Out.

Track listing
"Stranger Than Fiction"
"Nebraska"
"Letter Home"

External links
Moe website

Moe (band) live albums
1999 live albums